Time Expired is a 2011 comedy-drama film directed by Nick Lawrence, written by Rachel Tucker, and starring Eric Starkey, Topher Owen, Carrie Slaughter, and Rebekah Turner. It was shot in Oklahoma for a budget of $26,000. It premiered at WorldFest-Houston International Film Festival in April, 2011, where it won a Silver Remi award for best comedy feature.

Premise
Randall, a meter maid with a terminal illness, wishes to live out his last days quietly, but his friends and family have other ideas.

References

External links

2011 films
American independent films
2011 comedy-drama films
2011 independent films
2010s English-language films
2010s American films